Jana Semecká (born 12 January 1948) is a Czech volleyball player. She competed in the women's tournament at the 1972 Summer Olympics.

References

1948 births
Living people
Czech women's volleyball players
Olympic volleyball players of Czechoslovakia
Volleyball players at the 1972 Summer Olympics
Place of birth missing (living people)